Brandon Township is a township in Minnehaha County, in the U.S. state of South Dakota.

History
Brandon Township was named after Brandon, Vermont.

References

Townships in Minnehaha County, South Dakota
Townships in South Dakota